This table displays the top-rated primetime television series of the 1992–93 season as measured by Nielsen Media Research.

References

1992 in American television
1993 in American television
1992-related lists
1993-related lists
Lists of American television series